Bratz The Video: Starrin' & Stylin', or simply Bratz: Starrin' & Stylin', is a 2004 animated teen comedy film that was produced by CinéGroupe and released on DVD by 20th Century Fox Home Entertainment, and later re-released by Lionsgate Home Entertainment. It can now be found on digital online streaming on Vudu and digital download on iTunes. This is the first Bratz movie that was released.

Plot
Cloe, Yasmin, Sasha and Jade get ready for prom night. Their art teacher, Mr. Del Rio, assigned them a project to express themselves. Asked by the girls to give them extra time for the project, the professor denied the girls' petition, thus presenting them with a dilemma: Get prepared for prom night, or make a project that will count for 25 percent of their yearly grade.

Yasmin likes literature, Cloe likes art and drawing, Sasha likes music, and Jade likes fashion. They borrow a school video camera, so they can shoot a video and explain their points of view about the types of things they enjoy and like.

A day at the beach stresses out Sasha, who has volunteered to be the school's prom committee and chairperson. Problems arise when Sasha is insulted in the school's newspaper column. The girls automatically blame Cameron and Dylan for telling the writer about their conversation at the beach. Cloe crashes her car in the woods when she is driving with the girls to avoid a skunk, which they mistaken for a cat, and they call Cameron, an expert mechanic, to come and fix it.

When the girls go shopping for prom outfits, Jade doubts her sense of fashion when she picks out an outrageous outfit the others disapprove of. Gossip appears in the school paper about Jade. They figure it was not the boys because there they could not have heard about Jade's meltdown. At Cloe's sleepover, they apologize to Cameron and give him a makeover to make up for their accusations. Later that night, Jade accidentally leaves the video camera on, and someone can be seen walking around the room writing in a notepad.

At school, everyone is going bonkers over the picture of Cameron during the makeover the girls gave him. He blames Cloe and tells her to pick up her car because he is not going to the prom after.

The girls try to figure out which one of them has been betraying their secrets, and they suspect that Yasmin could be the possible culprit since she knew about Sasha's frustration with the prom preparation, was the only one who consulted Jade at the mall about her fashion sense issues, and had access to the video camera the night before. She was writing the columns, as a ghost writer. When she confesses to the rest of the girls, they get mad at her and ignore her. The girls try to forget about Yasmin by going to the spa but have a terrible time without her. They admit they were the ones who had given her the idea to write more interesting stories.

Yasmin returns and apologizes, explaining that people used to comment that her column was boring, and that, after she spread gossip about people around school, those who knew she was the ghost writer made her feel important. Her friends apologize to her in return for their own comments and forgive each other. Cameron forgives Yasmin after she explains the whole thing to him.

On prom night, the caterers are arriving 2 hours after on time due to a traffic jam, the photographer quitting to become a painter, and the DJ being home sick with a fever. The girls come up with a plan for a do-it-yourself prom, they are making a disco ball work, setting up balloons, using their video camera to take digital pictures, preparing their own food, playing their own music, and turning an empty room into a dance hall. Jade is elected prom queen while Dylan is elected prom king.

After their video, which included the prom night dance, was shown to their art professor and the whole class, he gave the four girls an A-plus on their project.

Voice cast 

 Nikki Kaffee as Cloe
 India Thomas as Sasha
 Jillian Thompson as Jade
 Janice Kawaye as Yasmin
 Ogie Banks as Dylan
 Yuri Lowenthal as Cameron

All of the voice actors were uncredited. The rest of the voice cast, aside from the Bratz girls, and Cameron and Dylan, are Katherine Cohn Beck, Bishanyia Vincent, Ines Vaz De Sousa, and Danielle Baynes, who were also uncredited.

References

External links
 DVFverdict review 
 Entertainment.kaboose review
 Digitallyobsessed review
 NYTimes review 
 epinions review 

2004 direct-to-video films
2004 animated films
2004 films
Bratz
Films based on television series
American direct-to-video films
2000s English-language films
20th Century Fox animated films
20th Century Fox direct-to-video films
Direct-to-video animated films
2000s American animated films
Films based on fashion dolls
2000s teen comedy films
Films about proms
Canadian animated feature films
Films set in the United States
High school films
Canadian direct-to-video films
2004 comedy films
2000s Canadian films